John Montgomery (18 June 1876 – 1940) was a Scottish footballer who played in the Football League for Notts County.

References

1871 births
1940 deaths
Scottish footballers
English Football League players
Association football defenders
Tottenham Hotspur F.C. players
Notts County F.C. players